Haiming is a municipality in the district of Altötting in Bavaria in Germany, located between the rivers Inn and Salzach.

References

Altötting (district)
Populated places on the Inn (river)